Hilda Lorna Johnstone MBE (4 September 1902 – 18 May 1990) was an Olympic equestrian specialising in dressage who represented Great Britain in three Summer Olympic Games. She was born in York.

She participated in the 1956, 1968 and 1972 Olympic Games. In the last event, aged 70, she became the oldest ever British competitor and oldest ever woman to take part in the Olympic Games. Her best finish was 5th place in the 1968 Mixed Dressage Team event.

References
Mini biography at Sports Reference.com

1902 births
1990 deaths
British female equestrians
British dressage riders
Members of the Order of the British Empire
Sportspeople from York
Place of death missing
Olympic equestrians of Great Britain
Equestrians at the 1956 Summer Olympics
Equestrians at the 1968 Summer Olympics
Equestrians at the 1972 Summer Olympics
English female equestrians